KEVA-LD, virtual channel 34 (UHF digital channel 34), is a television station licensed to Boise, Idaho, United States. Founded November 10, 1993, the station is owned by Sawtooth Mountain Broadcast & Wireless Corp.

As of summer 2020, the station is using ATSC 3.0 and is to be one of two stations in Boise (the other being KBSE-LD) delivering Evoca, an upcoming over-the-air subscription TV service. KEVA-LD transmits 20 encrypted channels, with KBSE-LD transmitting an additional 20.

References

External links

EVA-LD
Television channels and stations established in 2001
2001 establishments in Idaho
Low-power television stations in the United States
ATSC 3.0 television stations